Palmans-Collstrop may refer to:
, a Swedish cycling team
, a Belgian cycling team